Leney is an unincorporated community in Perdue Rural Municipality No. 346, Saskatchewan, Canada. The community had a population of 30 in 2001. It previously held the status of a village until December 31, 1971. The hamlet is located 68 km west of the City of Saskatoon on highway 655 3 km south the town of Perdue and highway 14 on the Canadian National Railway.

History
Prior to December 31, 1971, Leney was incorporated as a village, and was restructured as a hamlet under the jurisdiction of the Rural municipality of Perdue on that date.

Climate
The Köppen Climate Classification subtype for this climate is "Dfb (Warm Summer Continental Climate).

See also

List of Grand Trunk Pacific Railway stations
List of communities in Saskatchewan

References

Perdue No. 346, Saskatchewan
Former villages in Saskatchewan
Unincorporated communities in Saskatchewan
Populated places disestablished in 1971